Adam Terrell Smith (born November 8, 1992) is an American professional basketball player who last played for Hapoel Holon of the Israel Basketball Premier League.

High school career
Smith played high school basketball with Fayette County High School in Fayetteville, Georgia.

College career
Smith played with three colleges from 2011 to 2016. His best scoring season was 2015–16 with Georgia Tech, in which he scored 15 points per game.

Professional career
Smith started his professional career with the Italian club Roseto. He was the second leading scorer of Serie B Basket, averaging 23,6 points per game. 

During the 2017–18 season, Smith played for four clubs. He started the season with Élan Chalon. On November 19, 2017, he joined Socar Petkim, where he stayed until February. He then played with Pallacanestro Orzinuovi and Orlandina Basket until the end of the season. In 2018 he joined Ravenna, where he averaged 23.9 points, 4.1 rebounds and 2.9 assists per game. 

On August 28, 2019, Smith signed with Greek club PAOK. Smith emerged as the MVP for the 14th fixture of the Greek Basket League after an important 101-84 victory over Aris. On February 19, 2020 Smith left PAOK due to late payments and a breach of contract. 

Smith then signed with Ionikos Nikaias on September 18, 2020. In 14 games with the Greek team, he averaged 16.1 points, 2.1 rebounds, and 4.4 assists. On March 12, 2021, Smith transferred to Polish club Zielona Góra, replacing the injured Nikos Pappas.

On July 27, 2021, he has signed with Merkezefendi Belediyesi Denizli Basket of the Basketbol Süper Ligi.

On December 16, 2021, he signed with Hapoel Holon of the Israel Basketball Premier League.

References

External links
Real GM Profile
Eurobasket.com Profile
TBLStat.net Profile

1992 births
Living people
American men's basketball players
American expatriate basketball people in France
American expatriate basketball people in Italy
American expatriate basketball people in Greece
American expatriate basketball people in Turkey
Basket Zielona Góra players
Bilbao Basket players
Élan Chalon players
Georgia Tech Yellow Jackets men's basketball players
Hapoel Holon players
Merkezefendi Belediyesi Denizli Basket players
Orlandina Basket players
P.A.O.K. BC players
Petkim Spor players
Point guards
Roseto Sharks players
Shooting guards
UNC Wilmington Seahawks men's basketball players
Virginia Tech Hokies men's basketball players